Ajit Anjum is an Indian journalist. He has worked as managing editor at News 24 and India TV news channels. He was awarded the Ramnath Goenka Excellence in Journalism Awards in 2010.

Early life
Anjum, named Ajit Kumar at birth, was born in the Begusarai district of Bihar. His father, Ramsagar Prasad Singh, was in the Bihar Judicial Services as a judge at Patna. Anjum had his early education at Begusarai and Darbhanga. He obtained his bachelor's degree from Langat Singh College, Muzaffarpur, affiliated to Bihar University.

Anjum started his career as a journalist while pursuing his studies at Muzaffarpur. He changed his last name from Kumar to Anjum while working as a local reporter at the Patliputra Times. Working as freelance journalist in Patna, he wrote for Dharmyug, Saptahik Hindustaan, Dinmaan and Ravivar. He went to Delhi in 1989 and started working at Amar Ujala.

Career
In 1994, Anjum began his career in journalism by joining BAG Films as director of the talk show Rubaru hosted by the Congress leader Rajeev Shukla. He worked for fifteen years with BAG Films and produced many shows in that period. He then moved to Aaj Tak as a senior producer but did not stay there very long. He rejoined BAG Films and, as an employee of BAF, he spearheaded the launch of News 24 in 2007. While with News 24, he was awarded the Ramnath Goenka Award for his reporting of the flood in Bihar in 2010. Anjum managed a campaign on News 24 that resulted in truckloads of relief materials reaching the victims. As a result, Fem magazine mentioned him in its list of 50 most powerful people of Bihar in its survey conducted in 2016. 

He left News 24 in 2014 and joined India TV as its managing editor, working under editor-in-chief Rajat Sharma. While Anjum was working at India TV, a senior correspondent of the same TV news channel, Imran Shaikh, accused Anjum of pressurising him to tweak news in favour of a political party. Anjum denied the charge through a Facebook post.

While working with Star News, he conceptualized shows like Red Alert, Sansani and Pol Khol.

Awards
 Ramnath Goenka Excellence in Journalism Awards, 2010.

References

External links
Ajit Anjum's website

Living people
Indian male television journalists
People from Begusarai
Journalists from Bihar
1969 births
Indian political journalists
Managing editors